Quy Nhon is a coastal city in Bình Định province in central Vietnam. Quy Nhon is the capital of Bình Định province. As of 2019 its population was 457,400. Historically, the commercial activities of the city focused on agriculture and fishing. In recent years, however, there has been a significant shift towards service industries and tourism. There is also a substantial manufacturing sector.

History
The town of Quy Nhon was officially founded in the late 18th century, although its origins stretch back much further to the 11th-century Champa culture, the Tây Sơn dynasty and the 18th century seaport of Thị Nại. During the 1620s the town was host to Portuguese Jesuits who called the place Pulo Cambi.

During the Ming treasure voyages of the 15th century, the Chinese fleet led by Admiral Zheng He would always make port at Quy Nhon in Champa as their first destination after leaving China. The city was subject to a Mongol invasion in the Battle of Thị Nại Bay (1283)  during the Mongol invasions of Vietnam.

The city is renowned as the birthplace of 18th century Vietnamese emperor Nguyễn Huệ. It was also the site of the Bombardment of Qui Nhơn in 1861, and more recently, it had a large American and Korean military presence, especially the Capital Mechanized Infantry Division of the Republic of Korea Army during the Vietnam War. Today the city is recognized as a first class city with a geo-economic priority and an urbanized infrastructure. The government describes it as one of the three commercial and tourism centres of the central southern coastal region (with Da Nang and Nha Trang).

Geography

Quy Nhon has a varied topography, being extremely diversified with mountains and forests, hills, fields, salt marshes, plains, lagoons, lakes, rivers, shorelines, peninsulas and islands. Hà Thanh River flows through city.

The city has sixteen wards: Trần Hưng Đạo, Lê Lợi, Lê Hồng Phong, Trần Phú, Lý Thường Kiệt, Nguyễn Văn Cừ, Đống Đa, Thị Nại, Hải Cảng, Ngô Mây, Ghềnh Ráng, Quang Trung, Nhơn Bình, Nhơn Phú, Bùi Thị Xuân and Trần Quang Diệu.

Climate
Quy Nhon has a tropical savanna climate (Köppen Aw), very close to being classified as a tropical monsoon climate (Am), with year round very warm to hot temperatures and distinct wet and dry seasons. The city is occasionally hit by the tail-end of typhoons hitting further up the coast.

Transportation

Quy Nhon is served by Vietnam Airlines, Bamboo Airways, VietJet Air and Pacific Airlines through Phu Cat Airport, with flights to Hanoi and Ho Chi Minh City.

Quy Nhơn railway station could be reached by a branch off the main line of the North–South railway, but this line was suspended in May 2016.

Economy 

Quy Nhon is one of the main industrial centres of the South Central Coast, behind only Da Nang and Nha Trang. It is also the major industrial and service centre of Bình Định Province, including its largest industrial facilities at Phu Tai Industrial Park and Nhơn Hội Economic Zone. The city's economic activities include industries, export-imports, seaport services, aquatic product husbandry and tourism. The economic trend, at present, is increasingly service-based at the expense of agriculture, forestry and pisciculture.

Cereals are cultivated on 2548 ha of Quy Nhon's land with an output of 13,021 tons as of 2009, just 2% of the province's total. Other crops included 10,891 tons of vegetables, 2,795 tons of sugar-cane, as well as smaller amounts of coconuts, peanuts and cashew nuts.

Much of the city's industry is concentrated in and around Phu Tai Industrial Park in the west of the city along National Route 1A. Quy Nhon is a major centre of garden furniture manufacturing. It has traditionally been relying on access to wood from Bình Định's forests as well as the Central Highlands provinces of Gia Lai and Kon Tum and even as far as Cambodia's Ratanakiri and Laos' Attapeu province. Most of the furniture factories are located in Phu Tai Industrial Park. Several chemical enterprises that supply the furniture and wood processing industry have been set up in the vicinity of the industrial park.

Other industries in Quy Nhon process agricultural and aquatic products, or produce construction materials and paper products. Bidiphar is a pharmaceutical company headquartered in Quy Nhon that is an exception to the city's general focus on basic and wood processing industries. Nhơn Hội Economic Zone is central to the city's and province's industrial development plans. However, as of late 2010 it was still in the early stages of development, with few factories completed.

Quy Nhon has seen only limited foreign investment. As of 2008, thirteen foreign companies employed 1119 people in the city.

Currently the economic structure of Quy Nhon is a shift towards increasing the proportion of service industries, reducing the rate of agriculture, forestry and fisheries in GDP. The shares of agriculture, forestry and fisheries – industrial and construction – services in GDP in 2006 reached 36.7%, 28% and 35.3%, respectively, while in 2005 it was at 38.4%, 26.7% and 34.9%, respectively.

The income per capita in 2018 was US$6,025 per person.

Education 

Quy Nhon has two universities: Quy Nhon University and Quang Trung University. As of 2009 they had a total teaching staff of 601 and 23,383 students, 13,704 of whom were female. There were 19,900 primary school students and 28,500 secondary school students.

Cuisine 
Quy Nhon is home to multiple domestically famous Vietnamese dishes: 
 Bánh xèo tôm nhảy (jumping-shrimps fried pancake): These pancakes are made with special formulas and each restaurant has its own way of making distinguished dipping fish sauce for this dish.
 Bánh hỏi cháo lòng: The dish composes of two sub-dishes: "Bánh hỏi" (a type of rice cake in Vietnam) and "cháo lòng" (pig's internal organs porridge).
 Bún chả cá (fish-cake rice vermicelli).
 Chả ram tôm đất (shrimp spring roll).

Notable people
 Xavier Le Pichon (1937-), French geophysicist

Gallery

Notes

References

External links

 

Cities in Vietnam
Districts of Bình Định province
Populated places in Bình Định province
Port cities in Vietnam
Provincial capitals in Vietnam